Archery at the 2000 Summer Paralympics consisted of seven events, four for men and three for women. Competitors were divided into three categories:

W1: quadriplegic archers, or comparable disability, in wheelchairs
W2: paraplegic archers, or comparable disability, in wheelchairs
Standing: archers standing or shooting from a chair

Medal table

Participating nations

Medallists

See also 
 Archery at the 2000 Summer Olympics

References 
 

 
2000 Summer Paralympics events
2000
2000 in archery